The Walpole family is a famous English aristocratic family known for their 18th century political influence and for building notable country houses including Houghton Hall. Heads of this family have traditionally been the Earl of Orford. Robert Walpole, 10th Baron Walpole resided at Mannington Hall. Wolterton Hall has been undergoing restoration since 2016.

References

Bibliography 

 
 

 
English families